The Story of June is a Cantopop album by Edmond Leung.

Track listing
Love Blind (戀愛盲)
Elevator Men (電梯男)
Hey June 
Driven To Distraction (失魂落魄)
Daydream (白日夢)
Romantic (羅曼蒂克) 
Y3 
Get Away with Miriam Yeung (滾) 
The Aftermath (戰後餘生)
The Long Journey (路漫漫)

Music awards

References

Edmond Leung albums
2006 albums